Shushtari ( [ʃuʃtæri]) is a Persian dialect spoken in and around the city of Shushtar in Khuzestan Province in southwestern Iran. It constitutes a language with the Dezfuli dialect, which is spoken in Dezful, the adjacent city. The main difference between Dezfuli and Shushtari is in vowel pronunciation.

Personal pronouns

References 

Southwestern Iranian languages
Persian language